The 2006 Shanghai International Film Festival was the ninth such festival to be held, and took place over the course of two weeks between June 17 and June 25, 2006.

In all, over 764 films were submitted, but only seventeen were selected to compete for the Golden Goblet or "Jin Jue." The jury was chaired by French filmmaker Luc Besson.

International reaction 
The 2006 rendition of the Shanghai International Film Festival was meant to place the program as a top echelon international festival. Problems plagued the two-week festival, however, including poor Chinese-English translations and a failure by many of the filmmakers to even attend the award ceremony.

Awards 
 Golden Goblet Best Film
 Four Minutes (Germany) (directed by Chris Kraus
 Best Actor 
 Olivier Gourmet for his performance in Burnt Out (France)
 Best Actress 
 Els Dottermans for her performance in Love Belongs to Everyone (Belgium)
 Best Director
 Fabienne Godet for Burnt Out
 Best Screenplay
 Hugo Van Laere for Love Belongs to Everyone
 Best Cinematography
 Fabio Cianchetti for Our Land (Italy) (directed by Sergio Rubini)
 Best Music
 Karl Jenkins for River Queen (New Zealand) (directed by Vincent Ward)
 Jury Grand Prix

References

External links 
 9th Shanghai International Film Festival from the Internet Movie Database

Shan
Shanghai International Film Festival
Shanghai International Film Festival, 2006
Shanghai International Film Festival, 2006
21st century in Shanghai